The Blood Emergency Readiness Corps (known as "BERC" or the "BERC Program") consists of 33 U.S.-based community blood centers that work together to provide an emergency reserve of blood products to respond to a mass shooting or mass casualty event. The program is administered by the Alliance for Community Transfusion Services (ACTS). To date, the BERC reserve has responded to supply blood products needed as a result of the Collierville Kroger shooting (Collierville, TN), the 2021 Oxford High School shooting (Oxford Township, MI), the Tornado outbreak of December 10–11, 2021, and the Robb Elementary School Shooting (Uvalde, TX).

The following blood centers are participants in the program:
 Blood Assurance (Chattanooga, Tennessee)
 Bloodworks Northwest (Seattle, Washington)
 Blood Bank of Hawaii (Honolulu, Hawaii)
 Carter BloodCare (Dallas/Ft. Worth, Texas)
 Cascade Regional Blood Services (Tacoma, Washington)
 Central Pennsylvania Blood Bank (Hershey, Pennsylvania)
 Coastal Bend Blood Center (Corpus Christi, Texas)
 Community Blood Center (Dayton, Ohio)
 Community Blood Center of the Ozarks (Springfield, Missouri)
 ConnectLIfe (Buffalo, New York)
 Gulf Coast Regional Blood Center (Houston, Texas)
 Houchin Community Blood Bank (Bakersfield, California)
 ImpactLife (Davenport, Iowa)
 Inova Blood Donor Services (Sterling, Virginia)
 LIFELINE Blood Services (Jackson, Tennessee)
 LifeServe Blood Center (Des Moines, Iowa)
 LifeSouth Community Blood Centers (Gainesville, Florida)
 MEDIC Regional Blood Center (Knoxville, Tennessee)
 Miller-Keystone Blood Center (Bethlehem, Pennsylvania)
 Mississippi Blood Services (Jackson, Mississippi)
 Northern California Community Blood Bank (Eureka, California)
 Oklahoma Blood Institute (Oklahoma City, Oklahoma)
 Rock River Valley Regional Blood Center (Rockford, Illinois)
 South Texas Blood & Tissue Center (San Antonio, Texas)
 Stanford Blood Center (Palo Alto, California)
 SunCoast Blood Centers (Sarasota, Florida)
 The Blood Center (New Orleans, Louisiana)
 The Blood Connection (Greenville, South Carolina)
 The Community Blood Center (Appleton, Wisconsin)
 Versiti (Milwaukee, Wisconsin)
 Vitalant (Scottsdale, Arizona)
 We Are Blood (Austin, Texas)
 Western Kentucky Regional Blood Center (Owensboro, Kentucky)

References

External links 
 Blood Emergency Readiness Corps (BERC)

Blood banks in the United States
Health care-related professional associations
Blood donation